Maarssen is a railway station in Maarssenbroek and on the opposite side of the Amsterdam Rijnkanaal to Maarssen, Netherlands. The station opened on 18 December 1843 and is located on the Amsterdam–Arnhem railway. The services are operated by Nederlandse Spoorwegen.

In 1953 the station was served by two trains to and from Amsterdam per day. The service improved in the 1970s following the building of Maarssenbroek, and in 1974 the station had an hourly service. In 1975 the station had a half-hourly service.

A (fourth) new station building was built in 2004. In a 2005 survey approximately 5,523 passengers use this station per day.

Train services
The following services currently call at Maarssen:
2x per hour local service (sprinter) Amsterdam - Utrecht - Rhenen
2x per hour local service (sprinter) Breukelen - Utrecht - Veenendaal Centrum

Bus services
The following bus services depart from the bus station outside the station:

32 - Station Maarssen - Maarssenbroek - Maarssen - Rijnsweerd - De Uithof (University) / AZU (Hospital) (3x per day - Peak Hours)
34 - Station Maarssen - - Maarssen - Utrecht Centraal (2x per hour, Line 34 do's morning around 5:00 / 7:00 and afternoon around 18:00 rides all day on Saturday and Sunday Same route as Line 36)
36 - Station Maarssen - Maarssen - Utrecht Centraal (4x per hour, Line 34 do's morning around 5:00 / 7:00 and afternoon around 18:00 rides all day on Saturday and Sunday)
37 - Station Maarssen - Maarssenbroek - Utrecht North-West - Utrecht Centraal (4x per hour, 2x per hour on Sundays)
38 - Station Maarssen - Maarssenbroek - Utrecht North-West - Utrecht Centraal (4x per hour, Not Sundays)
39 - Station Maarssen - Maarssenbroek - Utrecht West (Near Station Utrecht Terwijde) - Utrecht Centraal (2x per hour)
48 - Station Maarssen - Lage Weide - Nieuwegein - Houten
126 - Station Maarssen - Vleuten - De Meern (1x per hour - Only Monday - Friday)
420 - Utrecht Centraal -> Vleuten -> Station Maarssen -> Breukelen -> Loenen aan de Vecht -> Utrecht Centraal 3x per night (only Friday night)
532 - Station Maarssen - Maarssenbroek - Utrecht Centraal (FC-Utrecht Express)

All Bus Services, are operated by the U-OV - Utrecht Municipal.

Gallery

External links
NS website 
Dutch Public Transport journey planner 

Railway stations in Utrecht (province)
Railway stations on the Rhijnspoorweg
1843 establishments in the Netherlands
Buildings and structures in Stichtse Vecht
Railway stations in the Netherlands opened in 1843